The 2011 Berlin state election was held on 18 September 2011 to elect the members of the 17th Abgeordnetenhaus of Berlin. The incumbent government consisting of the Social Democratic Party (SPD) and The Left lost its majority.

The SPD lost five seats, remaining the largest party, while The Left lost three. The Christian Democratic Union (CDU) made small gains, while The Greens moved into third place with 30 seats. The Free Democratic Party (FDP) lost three-quarters of its votes and all its seats. The Pirate Party contested its first Berlin state election and won fifteen seats with 8.9% of the vote. This was the first time the party had been elected to a state parliament anywhere in Germany.

The SPD initially sought a coalition with The Greens, but talks broke down over the extension of the Bundesautobahn 100. A coalition agreement between the SPD and CDU was finalised in November, with Mayor Klaus Wowereit continuing in office.

Parties
The table below lists parties represented in the 16th Abgeordnetenhaus of Berlin.

Issues and campaign

Christian Democratic Union
The CDU considered safety on the Berlin U-Bahn an issue after a number of attacks on the property of the U-Bahn. The party published material using images from attacks captioned with the question "Safe?" These were later recalled. The CDU also posted billboards comparing the number of police officers cut from the force by the red-red coalition with the number of crimes committed on the city's buses and U-Bahn trains. Nils Diederich, a professor of political science at the Free University of Berlin, stated prior to the election that he did not believe this would be much of an issue due to a positive mood within the city.

Social Democratic Party
The SPD top candidate and mayor Klaus Wowereit stated, after "well-publicized attacks" in late winter and spring, that he planned to heighten security by increasing the number of police officers by 200 and lengthening the time video surveillance recordings are kept before being erased from 24 to 48 hours.

Post-election

Election results and analysis
The Free Democratic Party (FDP) representation was removed from the Abgeordnetenhaus of Berlin after they failed to reach the 5% threshold. This was the fifth time in 2011 in Germany that the Free Democrats failed to obtain representation in a state parliament. They also lost representation in Saxony-Anhalt, Rhineland-Palatinate, Bremen and Mecklenburg-Vorpommern. Baden-Württemberg and Hamburg are the only states in which they reached the 5% electoral threshold in that year. The win in Berlin marks the 7th time out of seven elections in 2011 that the Social Democrats got into government.

Voting problems
On 21 September 2011, election officials found that the results of the Green Party and The Left were inadvertently swapped in the Lichtenberg district. Evrim Baba-Sommer of the Green Party will replace Karin Seidel-Kalmutzki of the Social Democratic Party.

On 22 September 2011, Norbert Kopp, the district mayor for Steglitz-Zehlendorf, confirmed at least 379 postal ballots had found their way into the bin of a block of flats. The ballots were properly sent to the Zehlendorf city hall and the votes could change a number of the local council seats. The police have started an investigation over the incident.

Coalition talks
Initially, the Social Democrats concentrated on forming a coalition with the Greens. However, on 5 October 2011, coalition talks between the SPD and the Greens broke down. The disagreement was about the extension of Bundesautobahn 100. The Green Party platform had insisted on not extending the Bundesautobahn 100. The Social Democrats offered a compromise to not go ahead with the 3.2 km extension A100 if the €420 million provided by the federal government could be invested in other transportation infrastructure projects. However, the federal government rejected the possibility of transferring the money to other projects. Green Party head Bettina Jarasch stated that "There was not really the will within the SPD to work together with us on a coalition" while the Berliner Zeitung wrote that "the left-wing of the SPD felt Wowereit and Müller had actually wanted to form a coalition with the CDU and had deliberately put the Greens in an impossible situation." Michael Müller, chairman of Berlin chapter of the Social Democratic Party, had "threatened to look towards the CDU" over the past weekend, because the Greens "stuck to their opposition to the motorway extension". Müller pointed out to the Greens "that the Red-Green coalition would only have a one-vote majority compared to the stable 10-vote majority which would be achieved in coalition with the CDU". Wolfgang Thierse, deputy Parliamentary group leader, stated "that he was surprised and a little disappointed at the breakdown of talks" and "Just as Red-Green would not have been heaven for Berlin, Red-Black would not be hell". Renate Künast, leader of the Berlin Chapter of the Green Party, stated that Klaus Wowereit "wanted a surrender, and no coalition".

The Social Democrats therefore continued talks with the Christian Democrats so that a grand coalition that would govern Berlin was finalized on 16 November 2011. According to the 100-page coalition agreement, Wowereit will continue as mayor. Also, each party receives four ministries: Social Democrats will be in charge of the Finance, City development/Environment, Education/Youth/Science, and Jobs/Integration/Women portfolios, whereas the Christian Democrats will have Interior/Sports, Economy/Technology/Research, Health/Social, and Justice/Consumer protection. Disagreements between the two parties have been settled. There will be for example a "City tax" of 5% for hotel guests beginning in 2013 and the minimum wage for public contract jobs will increase by €1 per hour (currently at €7.50). Plans were dropped for making teachers civil servants again and requiring property owners to contribute to street improvement costs. Wowereit summarised the talks by saying "We want Berlin to become richer and to stay sexy".

Opinion polling

Election result

|-
| colspan=9 align=center| 
|-
! colspan="2" | Party
! Votes
! %
! +/-
! Seats 
! +/-
! Seats %
|-
| bgcolor=| 
| align=left | Social Democratic Party (SPD)
| align=right| 413,332
| align=right| 28.3
| align=right| 2.5
| align=right| 48
| align=right| 5
| align=right| 31.6
|-
| bgcolor=| 
| align=left | Christian Democratic Union (CDU)
| align=right| 341,158
| align=right| 23.4
| align=right| 2.1
| align=right| 39
| align=right| 2
| align=right| 25.7
|-
| bgcolor=| 
| align=left | Alliance 90/The Greens (Grüne)
| align=right| 257,063
| align=right| 17.6
| align=right| 4.5
| align=right| 30
| align=right| 7
| align=right| 19.7
|-
| bgcolor=| 
| align=left | The Left (Linke)
| align=right| 171,050
| align=right| 11.6
| align=right| 4.6
| align=right| 20
| align=right| 3
| align=right| 13.2
|-
| bgcolor=| 
| align=left | Pirate Party Germany (Piraten)
| align=right| 130,105
| align=right| 8.9
| align=right| New
| align=right| 15
| align=right| New
| align=right| 9.9
|-
! colspan=8|
|-
| bgcolor=| 
| align=left | National Democratic Party (NPD)
| align=right| 31,241
| align=right| 2.1
| align=right| 0.4
| align=right| 0
| align=right| ±0
| align=right| 0
|-
| bgcolor=| 
| align=left | Free Democratic Party (FDP)
| align=right| 26,943
| align=right| 1.8
| align=right| 5.8
| align=right| 0
| align=right| 13
| align=right| 0
|-
| bgcolor=| 
| align=left | Human Environment Animal Protection
| align=right| 21,612
| align=right| 1.5
| align=right| 0.6
| align=right| 0
| align=right| ±0
| align=right| 0
|-
| bgcolor=grey| 
| align=left | Pro Germany Citizens' Movement
| align=right| 17,829
| align=right| 1.2
| align=right| New
| align=right| 0
| align=right| New
| align=right| 0
|-
| bgcolor=|
| align=left | Others
| align=right| 50,732
| align=right| 3.5
| align=right| 
| align=right| 0
| align=right| ±0
| align=right| 0
|-
! align=right colspan=2| Total
! align=right| 1,461,185
! align=right| 100.0
! align=right| 
! align=right| 152
! align=right| 3
! align=right| 
|-
! align=right colspan=2| Voter turnout
! align=right| 
! align=right| 60.2
! align=right| 2.2
! align=right| 
! align=right| 
! align=right| 
|}

Notes

References

State election, 2011
2011 elections in Germany
2011 in Berlin